Mari Blanchard (born Mary E. Blanchard, April 13, 1923 – May 10, 1970) was an American film and television actress, known foremost for her roles as a B movie femme fatale in American productions of the 1950s and early 1960s.

Early life and career
Although some reference sources cite Mari Blanchard's birth year as 1927 or 1932, she was actually born on April 13, 1923, in Long Beach, California.  A polio survivor at age nine, Blanchard's health eventually improved enough that she ran away from home and joined a circus in her teens. She then attended the University of Southern California, University of California, Los Angeles and Santa Barbara State College.

In the late 1940s, Blanchard became a successful print model and film extra; however, after a producer saw her in an advertisement for bubble bath, she began to have some limited success as an actress on the "big screen."  From 1950 to 1951, she took small roles in a number of films at MGM, RKO, and Paramount, until she was signed by Universal-International in 1952. Her first film at Universal was Back at the Front, followed by the 1953 romantic adventure The Veils of Bagdad in which she co-starred with Victor Mature.

One of Blanchard's more memorable film roles, however, was her portrayal of a Venusian queen, Allura, in the 1953 comedy Abbott and Costello Go to Mars.  She then starred in 1954 in Destry, a Western with Audie Murphy, reprising a character whom Marlene Dietrich had played in the story's original 1939 version, Destry Rides Again, but changing the character's name from "Frenchy" to "Brandy."

Some other films of the 1950s in which she is featured include Son of Sinbad (1955), Stagecoach to Fury (1956), She Devil (1957), Jungle Heat (1957), No Place to Land (1958), and Machete (1958).  Following her work on these films, Blanchard began to focus increasingly on performing on television, although she did appear in a few other films in the 1960s, including a small but flamboyant role as Camille in McLintock! (1963), directed by Andrew MacLaglen and starring John Wayne.

On television, Blanchard appeared in "Escape From Fear" (1955), an episode of the anthology series Climax!. She made guest appearances in various television series through the late 1960s, including Rawhide (1959 and 1961: two episodes, two different characters), Bachelor Father (1959), Tales of Wells Fargo (1960), Laramie (1960), Sea Hunt (1960), Hawaiian Eye (1961), 77 Sunset Strip (1961: two episodes, two different characters), Perry Mason (1963, as the murder victim Irene Chase in the episode "The Case of the Melancholy Marksman"), Burke's Law (1965), The Virginian (1967), and It Takes a Thief (1968). She was a series regular in the short-lived Klondike (1960–1961: 12 episodes).

Personal life
Blanchard was married three times: to lawyer Reese Hale Taylor, Jr. (1960–1961); George Shepard (1965–1966); and to photographer Vincent J. Conti (1967–1970).

Retiring from film work after the release of McLintock! in 1963, Blanchard continued to perform on a few television series until her failing health finally forced her to end her career. Her last credited performance was in 1968, playing the part of Madame Gamar on the series It Takes a Thief.  Diagnosed with cancer in 1963, she struggled with the disease in those final performances and during her remaining years.  On May 10, 1970, she died in Woodland Hills, California; and in accordance with her wishes, her remains were cremated and scattered at sea.

Filmography

References

External links

 
 

1923 births
1970 deaths
American film actresses
American television actresses
Deaths from cancer in California
Actresses from California
People from Greater Los Angeles
20th-century American actresses